Christopher James Skidmore,  (born 17 May 1981) is a British politician, and author of popular history. He served as Minister of State for Universities, Science, Research and Innovation from December 2018 to July 2019, and from September 2019 to February 2020, during which he signed UK's Net Zero pledge into law.  He also served as Interim Minister for Energy and Clean Growth.  Most recently, he served as the Chair of the Independent Government Review on Net Zero, a position he has held since September 2022. 

Skidmore was first elected in 2010 as the Conservative member of Parliament (MP) for Kingswood, South Gloucestershire, and became vice-chairman of the Conservative Party for Policy in 2018. On 26 November 2022, he announced that he would be standing down at the next general election.

Early life and education
Skidmore was born on 17 May 1981 in Longwell Green, Avon. As a teenager, he became a member of the Conservative Party in 1996. Skidmore was educated at Bristol Grammar School, an independent day school, before attending Christ Church, Oxford, graduating in 2002 with a first-class degree in Modern History (BA).

Skidmore worked for David Willetts and Michael Gove as an advisor, and served as chairman of the Bow Group for 2007–08, before being appointed by another right-leaning think tank, Policy Exchange, as a research fellow.

Parliamentary career
After being selected to contest the marginal seat of Kingswood for the Conservatives in 2009, he was elected as its Member of Parliament at the 2010 general election, defeating incumbent Roger Berry of the Labour Party.

Skidmore served as a member of the Health Select Committee, leaving that committee on 17 June 2013 (being replaced by Charlotte Leslie), to sit on the Education Select Committee. He is also a member of the Free Enterprise Group of MPs, and along with colleagues co-authored After the Coalition (2011) and Britannia Unchained (2012). The authors of Britannia Unchained claimed that "Once they enter the workplace, the British are among the worst idlers in the world".

He was re-elected with an increased majority at the general election in 2015 and became Parliamentary Private Secretary to the chancellor of the exchequer.

From 2016 to 2018, Skidmore was Parliamentary Secretary for the Constitution. Following the 2018 cabinet reshuffle, he was sacked from this role but given the role of vice-chairman of the Conservative Party for policy.

Skidmore was named by the ConservativeHome website in 2012 as one of a minority of loyal Conservative backbench MPs not to have voted against the government in any significant rebellions. He was a regular guest on BBC political programmes, such as Daily Politics.

Skidmore was opposed to Brexit prior to the 2016 EU membership referendum. In February 2018, he argued in a speech to the Centre for Policy Studies that his party needed a broad and positive policy programme to gain wider support, further stating: "If we are just going to talk about Brexit then the Conservative Party will rapidly decline".

Skidmore was appointed Minister of State for Universities, Science, Research and Innovation on 5 December 2018, following Sam Gyimah's resignation over the government's Brexit policy.

On 27 June 2019, as Minister for Energy and Clean Growth, Skidmore signed the UK's Net Zero Pledge  into law, becoming the first major economy to do so. 

Following the appointment of Boris Johnson as Prime Minister in July 2019, Skidmore was moved to the Department for Health and Social Care, serving as the minister of state for health.

Following the resignation of Jo Johnson from cabinet, Skidmore re-assumed his position of minister of state for universities, science, research and innovation in September 2019. However, he was dismissed from government and replaced by Michelle Donelan as Minister of State for Universities and Amanda Solloway as Parliamentary Under-Secretary of State for Science, Research and Innovation in the cabinet reshuffle of February 2020.

Skidmore submitted a letter of no confidence in Boris Johnson on 6 July 2022 during mass resignations of government ministers.

He initially supported Rishi Sunak in the July–September 2022 Conservative Party leadership election, but later changed his support to Liz Truss.

On 26 September 2022, Skidmore launched the Net Zero Review pledging to use the review to focus on the UK’s fight against climate change while maximising economic growth to ensure energy security and affordability for consumers and businesses. 

On 19 October 2022, Skidmore put out a statement on Twitter, saying he could not 'support fracking' in a vote, citing his unwillingness to 'undermine the pledges [he] made at the 2019 General Election'. The government was reportedly treating this vote in favour of fracking as a confidence vote, so he could risk losing the Conservative Party whip.

On 16 January 2023, Skidmore published Mission Zero,  the final report of the Net Zero Review. The 340 page report, containing 129 recommendations on how to deliver the UK's net zero commitments has been widely welcomed by the energy and climate sector

Honours
Fellowship of the Royal Society of Arts (FRSA) (2008)
Fellowship of the Royal Historical Society (FRHistS) (2010)
Fellowship of the Society of Antiquaries of London (FSA) (10 October 2014)

 He was sworn in as a member of Her Majesty's Most Honourable Privy Council on 6 November 2019 at Buckingham Palace. This gave him the honorific title "The Right Honourable" for life.

Skidmore was appointed Officer of the Order of the British Empire (OBE) in the 2022 Birthday Honours for parliamentary and public service.

Bibliography
Edward VI: The Lost King of England (2007) 
Death and The Virgin: Elizabeth, Dudley and the Mysterious Fate of Amy Robsart (2010) 
Bosworth: The Birth of the Tudors (2013)  (published in the United States as The Rise of the Tudors: The Family That Changed English History, 2014)
Richard III: Brother, Protector, King (2017)

Notes

References

External links

Official website
Profile on the Conservative Party website 

Debrett's People of Today

1981 births
Living people
People educated at Bristol Grammar School
Politicians from Bristol
Alumni of Christ Church, Oxford
English non-fiction writers
English male non-fiction writers
Conservative Party (UK) MPs for English constituencies
Politics of South Gloucestershire District
Fellows of the Royal Historical Society
Fellows of the Society of Antiquaries of London
UK MPs 2010–2015
UK MPs 2015–2017
UK MPs 2017–2019
UK MPs 2019–present
Members of the Privy Council of the United Kingdom
Ministers for Universities (United Kingdom)
Officers of the Order of the British Empire
Free Enterprise Group